Undercover was a Bulgarian crime drama television series produced by Bulgarian National Television that premiered on BNT 1 on 17 April 2011. On 20 March 2016, the fifth season premiered on BNT 1. It was announced that it was the final season of the series.

The series tells the story of the undercover police officer Martin Hristov (Ivaylo Zahariev), who infiltrates the gang of Bulgarian mafia boss Petar 'Dzaro' Tudzharov (Mihail Bilalov).

Plot summary
Martin Hristov, a specially trained agent, is appointed to go undercover in the gang of Bulgaria's top mafia boss, Dzharo. On his way he faces numerous challenges in order to completely become part of the criminal world. His task becomes more complicated when he meets the big boss' girl, Sunny. While undercover he gets a promotion in the mafia hierarchy and becomes part of the world full of crime, violence and corruption.

The show is inspired by Martin Scorsese's 2006 film The Departed.

Cast

 Ivaylo Zahariev as Martin Hristov
 Irena Miliankova as Silvia Veleva - Sunny (season 1–2)
 Zahary Baharov as Ivo Andonov
 Vladimir Penev as Inspector Emil Popov
 Mihail Bilalov as Petar Tudzharov - Dzharo (season 1–4)
 Alexander Sano as Zdravko Kiselov - The Hair (season 1–3)
 Deyan Donkov as Vasil Nikolov (season 1–2)
 Kiril Efremov as Tihomir Gardev - Tisho the Twin (main: season 1–3; recurring: seasons 4–5)
 Ventsislav Yankov as Nikolay Rashev - Niki the Twin (season 1–3)
 Ivaylo Hristov as Kiril Hristov, Martin's father (main: season 1; guest: season 2) 
 Marian Valev as Rosen Gatzov - The Hook
 Hristo Mutafchiev as Alexander Mironov (main: season 2; recurring: season 1; guest: season 3)
 Tzvetana Maneva as Cveta Andonova, Ivo's mother (main: seasons 2–3; recurring: season 1)
 Georgi Staykov as Anton Damyanov (season 2)
 Petar Popyordanov as Momchil Neshev (season 2–3)
 Boyko Krastanov as Erol Metin (main: season 5; recurring: season 4)
 Yoanna Temelkova as Nia Tudzharova (main: season 5; recurring: season 4)

Episodes

Critical reception
Undercover has received critical acclaim as well as becoming a hit with viewers, managing to attract a strong audience from its debut. Critic Emil Antonov said the show "offers viewers a dynamic and tense atmosphere, and interesting characters in a crime drama attractive to much of the native audience. Although many of the stories in the new Bulgarian cinema navigate around the time of transition and development of crime in Bulgaria, Dimitar Mitovski manages to break this pattern. He creates a story that strikes a chord with Bulgarians and is dynamic enough to keep us distracted from our daily lives."

The series received five nominations for the Golden Nymph Award at the 2012 Monte-Carlo Television Festival: Sevda Shishmanova, Dimitar Mitovski and Ivan Doiko as Outstanding European Producer (Drama Series) and Outstanding International Producer (Drama Series); Mihail Bilalov and Zahary Baharov as Outstanding Actor in a Drama Series; and Irena Miliankova as Outstanding Actress in a Drama Series. Undercover also won "The Golden Umbrella" award for Best Series, as well as awards for best cinematography, best musical score and most popular series at the 2012 MediaMixx International Festival, devoted to all forms of media in Central and Eastern Europe.

However, the show has been criticized in Bulgaria for its depiction of graphic violence, sexual situations, profanity and drug use. During the fourth season, BNT head Vera Ankova threatened to pull state funding from the show, putting the series' future in doubt. Additionally, Bulgaria's Council for Electronic Media (CEM) demanded the series be fined for profanity and said its content was not suitable for its 20:45 timeslot. State regulators declined to fine the network so long as the show was moved to a later time slot.

International broadcast
While the first episode was in production, Fox Crime began negotiations to distribute the film internationally in other Balkan nations Romania, Slovenia, Bosnia and Herzegovina, Macedonia, Croatia, Montenegro and Albania. The early demand to distribute a series was a first for a BNT production.

In 2012, New Films International announced plans to distribute the series in China, Germany, France, Great Britain, Turkey and throughout Latin America.

In 2014, Netflix released the series in France.

References

External links
 
 
 New Films International: Undercover
 

Bulgarian television series
2011 Bulgarian television series debuts
2010s Bulgarian television series
2016 Bulgarian television series endings
Bulgarian National Television original programming